Anth The End is an Indian Hindi-language Drama written, directed and produced by K.S. Malhotra and starring Divya Dutta ,Mukul Dev, Dev Sharma and Samikssha Batnagar.

Cast 
 Divya Dutta
 Mukul Dev
 Dev Sharma
 Samikssha Batnagar
 Arun Bakshi
 Aman Dhaliwal 
 Deepraj Rana
 Lilliput

References

External links 
 
 

Indian drama films
2020s Hindi-language films